Sabato is an Italian surname. Notable people with the surname include:
Aaron Sabato (born 1999), American baseball player
Antonio Sabàto Sr. (born 1943), Italian actor
Antonio Sabato (footballer) (born 1958), Italian football player
Antonio Sabàto Jr. (born 1972), American actor and model
Ernesto Sabato (1911–2011), Argentine writer
Haim Sabato (born 1952), Israeli rabbi and writer
Jorge Sabato (born 1924), Argentine metallurgist
Larry Sabato (born 1952), political analyst
Mario Sabato (born 1945), Argentine film director and screenplay writer
Rocco Sabato (born 1982), Italian football player

Italian-language surnames